U.S. Route 191 (US 191) is a north–south United States Highway within Arizona. As it crosses the state, US 191 overlaps at various points: I-10, US 70, US 180, US 60, SR 61, I-40, SR 264, and US 160. Previously the route was designated as US 666 and SR 63.

Route description

Douglas to Safford
The national southern terminus of US 191 is located at an intersection with SR 80 west of Douglas, in Cochise County. It heads north from this junction, past Bisbee Douglas International Airport and then through the unincorporated communities of McNeal and Elfrida before passing by Sunizona and the western terminus of SR 181, which provides access to Chiricahua National Monument. The road curves west and heads toward Sunsites, where it turns to the northwest and passes by the community of Cochise with a bridge over the Union Pacific Railroad. Heading northeast, I-10/US 191 passes around Willcox, with three exits serving the town: Exit 336, which is the southwestern end of the Willcox I-10 Business Loop; Exit 340, which is the northern terminus of SR 186; and Exit 344, which serves as the northern end of the Business Loop.

Northeast of Willcox, US 191 leaves I-10 at Exit 352 and heads north toward Safford, leaving Cochise County and entering Graham County along the way. Just north of I-10, US 191 passes through an intersection with Page Ranch Road, officially designated as US 191 Wye . This provides a shortcut for traveling between Bowie and Safford, as the mainline of US 191 is curved toward the west near I-10. Going toward Safford, the eastern terminus of two state routes intersect the route, namely SR 266, which provides access to Fort Grant, and SR 366 in Swift Trail Junction, which climbs up to the summit of Mount Graham and provides access to Mount Graham International Observatory. Arriving in Safford, US 191 turns east at an intersection with 5th Street (US 70), where its  concurrency with US 70 begins.

Safford to St. Johns
Traveling east from Safford, US 70/US 191 passes by the communities of Solomon and San Jose before US 191 turns northeast to split from US 70. The route heads toward Three Way, passing through the Black Hills and entering Greenlee County. At Three Way, US 191 turns to the north, but the intersection is the northern terminus of SR 75, which heads toward Duncan, and the western terminus of SR 78, which heads into New Mexico toward Mule Creek.  Heading north, US 191 is a divided highway for about  until it arrives in Clifton, the start of the road's designation as the Coronado Trail Scenic Road (both an Arizona Scenic Route and a National Scenic Byway). This scenic road approximates the route taken by Francisco Vázquez de Coronado between 1540 and 1542. At the intersection with Zorrilla Street in Clifton, the US 191 designation temporarily ends and the road continues as US 191 Temporary through the Morenci mine .

At the northern end of the Morenci mine, the road reacquires its US 191 designation and travels through the Apache–Sitgreaves National Forests, in which it enters Apache County. The road through the forests is dangerous with no shoulders and many hairpin turns along steep mountainsides. About  through the forests, US 191 arrives in Alpine and intersects US 180, where their  concurrency begins. Continuing through the forests, the road travels through the community of Nutrioso before leaving the Apache–Sitgreaves National Forests. Just after leaving the forests, US 180/US 191 turns north at a T-intersection, the eastern terminus of SR 260. About  to the northwest, US 180/US 191 enters Springerville and turns to the west at another T-intersection, this time with Main Street, where a triple concurrency between US 60, US 180, and US 191 begins. The US 180/US 191 concurrency continues north for another , intersecting former SR 81, which leads to Lyman Lake State Park before arriving in St. Johns as White Mountain Drive.

St. Johns to Utah
In St. Johns, US 180/US 191 intersects Commercial Street (SR 61), where the US 180/US 191 concurrency ends but a concurrency with SR 61 begins. This concurrency leaves St. Johns and travels north for about  until SR 61 turns to the northeast and heads toward Zuni, New Mexico. Continuing north, US 191 immediately enters the Navajo Nation and then travels another  until it arrives at Interstate 40 in Sanders. From there, US /SR 264 heads west past Hubbell Trading Post National Historic Site and toward Burnside, where the concurrency ends at a roundabout junction with US 191, SR 264, and BIA Route 15.

At the roundabout, US 191 travels north to Chinle, where it intersects BIA Route 7, which provides access to Canyon de Chelly National Monument. Continuing north, the route intersects BIA Route 59 in Many Farms, BIA Route 12 in Round Rock, and BIA Route 35 in Rock Point, before arriving at a T-intersection with US 160 near Mexican Water. Here, US 191 shares the route with US 160 for about  until it turns to the north for its final  in Arizona, leaving the state at the Utah state line and entering San Juan County, heading toward Bluff.

History
US 191 has existed since 1926, however it did not enter Arizona at that time. With the exception of one piece built in 1981, US 191 was created in the 1980s and 90s from re-designating existing roads. The first section designated was new construction, extending from US 160 to the Utah state line across the Navajo Nation. The portion from US 160 to I-40 was originally SR 63. The portion south of I-40 was designated US 191 in 1992; it was previously U.S. Route 666.

Major intersections

Special routes
US 191 has three special routes within the state of Arizona.

Douglas business route

U.S. Business Route 191 (US 191 Bus.) is a business spur of US 191 located entirely within the city of Douglas, Arizona. The route was previously designated as US 666 Bus. until 1992, when US 666 and all its related routes in Arizona were renumbered to extensions and special routes of US 191.

US 191 Bus. begins at the Douglas port of entry. Heading northeast, US 191 takes on the name Pan American Avenue. The route is lined with several businesses and acts as the western boundary to downtown Douglas. Several large slag piles can be seen from US 191 to the west at the former location of the Douglas smelter. A number of warehouses and industrial structures are also located west of the highway. US 191 Bus. curves slightly in front of the Douglas Police Station (former train station) before terminating at an intersection with SR 80 and Historic US 80 16th Street and G Avenue. Westbound SR 80 provides a direct connection to US 191, which begins just over a mile west of town.

Major intersections

U.S. 191 Wye route

U.S. Route 191 Wye (US 191Y) is an unsigned auxiliary route of US 191 that runs from exit 355 of I-10 to US 191; it is also known as Page Ranch Road.  It serves as a shortcut for people traveling from westbound on I-10 to northbound on US 191 and from southbound on US 191 to eastbound on I-10.

Major intersections

Morenci mine temporary route

The route was previously designated as US 666 Temp. until 1992, when US 666 and all its related routes in Arizona were renumbered to extensions and special routes of US 191. This designation was created in 1974 for the rerouted section of the road, then US 666, that had to be moved farther away from the Morenci mine due to its growth.

US 191 Temp. begins at Zorilla Street in Clifton. Heading west, US 191 Temp. travels through Clifton's Chase Creek District before ascending the side of the Chase Creek Valley. The road then turns around at the end of the valley with a hairpin turn, where the original routing of the road (then US 666) can be seen leaving the current roadway and heading toward the mine.  The road continues to ascend the valley in a southern direction until it arrives in Morenci.  Here, the route turns north at the intersection of Burro Alley and Coronado Trail.  Originally, the route traveled straight at this intersection and went through Morenci, but a bypass was built in 1972. After leaving Morenci, the road passes through the Morenci mine, where it travels through three short tunnels in total. After its exit from the mine, the US 191 Temp. designation ends and the road continues as US 191 toward Alpine.

Major intersections

References

External links

Endpoints of US 191
U.S. 191 - AARoads

National Scenic Byways
91-1
91-1
1
Scenic highways in Arizona